This is a list of the rulers of Thuringia, a historical and political region of Central Germany.

Kings of Thuringia

450–500 Bisinus
500–530 Baderich
500–530 Berthachar
500–531 Herminafried
Conquered by the Franks.

Frankish dukes  of Thuringia

Merovingian dukes
632–642 Radulf I, "King of Thuringia" after 641
642–687 Heden I
687–689 Gozbert
689–719 Heden II, son
Carolingian dukes
849–873 Thachulf, Margrave of the Sorbian March
874–880 Radulf II, son
880–892 Poppo, House of Babenberg, dux Thuringorum in 892, deposed
882–886 Egino, brother
892–906 Conrad, ancestor of the Conradiner dynasty
907–908 Burchard, last duke, killed in battle against the Hungarians
Ruled by the Margraves of Meissen
1000–1002 Eckard I, Margrave of Meissen since 985, assassinated
1002–1003 William II, Count of Weimar
1046–1062 William IV, grandson, Margrave of Meissen
1062–1067 Otto, brother, Margrave of Meissen
1067–1090 Egbert II, son-in-law, Count of Brunswick from the Brunonen dynasty, killed in 1090, line extinct

Landgraves of Thuringia

Winzenburger
 1111/1112–1130 Herman I, Count of Winzenburg (deposed in 1130; died in 1138)

Ludovingians
1031–1056 Louis the Bearded
1056–1123 Louis the Springer
1123–1140 Louis I (first Landgrave from 1131)
1140–1172 Louis II the Iron
1172–1190 Louis III the Pious
1190–1217 Hermann I the Hard
1217–1227 Louis IV the Holy
1227–1241 Hermann II
1241–1242 Henry Raspe

House of Wettin

1242–1265 Henry the Illustrious, Margrave of Meissen and Lusatia since 1221
1265–1294 Albert the Degenerate, son, Margrave of Meissen from 1288 until 1292, sold Thuringia to
1294–1298 Adolf of Nassau-Weilburg, King of Germany (not Wettin)
1298–1307 Albert of Habsburg, King of Germany (not Wettin)
1298–1307 Theodoric IV, Margrave of Lusatia from 1291 until 1303
1298–1323 Frederick I
1323–1349 Frederick II
1349–1381 Frederick III
1349–1382 William I
1349–1406 Balthasar
1406–1440 Frederick IV
1440–1445 Frederick V
1445–1482 William II
1482–1485 Albert
1482–1486 Ernest
1486–1525 Frederick VI
1525–1532 John
1532–1547 John Frederick I
1542–1553 John Ernest
1554–1566 John Frederick II
1554–1572 John William

 
Thuringia
Thuringia
Thuringia
 
Thuringia-related lists